Umm al-Qutuf is an Arab village in northern Israel. Located in the triangle, it falls under the jurisdiction of Menashe Regional Council.

History
Pottery remains from the Hellenistic,  Roman, and Byzantine eras have been found here, as have pottery remains from the early Muslim and the Middle Ages.

Ottoman era
In 1882, the PEF's Survey of Western Palestine (SWP) found at Kh. Umm el Kutuf only "ruined walls."

British Mandate era
In the 1922 census of Palestine, conducted by the British Mandate authorities, Kherbet Umm al-Qatuf had a population of 11 Muslims.

See also
Arab localities in Israel

References

Bibliography

External links
 Welcome To Umm al-Qutaf 
Survey of Western Palestine, Map 8: IAA, Wikimedia commons

Menashe Regional Council
Arab villages in Israel
Triangle (Israel)
Populated places in Haifa District